Berjaya Air Sdn Bhd (doing business as Berjaya Air) is an airline with its head office in the Berjaya Hangar of the SkyPark Terminal Building on the property of Sultan Abdul Aziz Shah Airport in Subang, Selangor, Malaysia.

As of 2018, the airline operates charter flights only.

History 

The airline was established and began operations in 1989. It is owned by the Berjaya Group (through Berjaya Land) and was formerly known as Pacific Air Charter.

At one time the airline had its head office in Terminal 3 at Sultan Abdul Aziz Shah Airport.

Current destinations 
Berjaya Air operates to the following destinations :

  
 Subang - Sultan Abdul Aziz Shah Airport Hub
  
 Tioman - Tioman Airport
  
 Redang - Redang Airport
  
 Pangkor - Pangkor  Airport
  
 Penang - Penang International Airport
  
 Langkawi - Langkawi International Airport

 Seletar Airport

 Hua Hin - Hua Hin Airport
 Koh Samui - Samui Airport

Former destinations 
Berjaya Air has operated to the following destinations :

 Changi Airport

The List of Routes that have been Served by Berjaya Air 

Berjaya Air has operate this route:

• Subang - Langkawi
• Langkawi - Subang 

• Subang - Pangkor
• Pangkor - Subang

• Subang - Penang
• Penang - Subang

• Subang - Redang
• Redang - Subang

• Singapore Seletar - Redang
• Redang - Singapore Seletar

• Subang - Tioman
• Tioman - Subang

• Singapore Seletar - Tioman
• Tioman - Singapore Seletar

• Subang - Ipoh (cooperate with Infinity & Silverfly)
• Ipoh - Subang (cooperate with Infinity & Silverfly)
• Johor Bahru - Ipoh (cooperate with Infinity)
• Ipoh - Johor Bahru (cooperate with Infinity)
• Kota Bharu - Ipoh (cooperate with Silverfly)
• Ipoh - Kota Bharu (cooperate with Silverfly)
• Medan - Ipoh (cooperate with Silverfly)
• Ipoh - Medan (cooperate with Silverfly)

• Subang - Melaka
• Melaka - Subang
• Padang - Melaka
• Melaka - Padang

• Subang - Koh Samui
• Koh Samui - Subang

• Subang - Hua Hin
• Hua Hin - Subang

Fleet

Current fleet
Berjaya Air operates the following aircraft (as of August 2019):

Fleet development
Berjaya Air operated a fleet of ATR 72-500s and de Havilland Canada Dash 7-100 on several routes until 2014. The airline has since maintained its operators’ certificate by keeping a Bombardier Challenger 300, which is used for charter flights.

The airline announced at the 2018 Singapore Airshow the purchase of two second hand ATR 42-500s. The aircraft will be used to launch flights from Redang to Kuala Lumpur and Singapore.

Former fleet
Berjaya Air has previously operated the following aircraft:
 3 de Havilland Canada Dash 7-100
 4 ATR 72-500

References

External links 

 Berjaya Air

Malaysian companies established in 1989
Air
Airlines of Malaysia
Privately held companies of Malaysia